Chequerfield is a district made up mostly of council housing of Pontefract, West Yorkshire, England.

Amenities

The estate has a parade of shops situated around Chequerfield Circle; which includes a convenience store, fish and chip shop, several takeaways and a Betfred bookmakers.  There is one pub; the Chequerfield Hotel also situated on the Cirle.  Pontefract Sports and Social Club is situated on the edge of the estate.  There are two churches on the estate; St Mary's Church of England church and Holy Family Roman Catholic Church (completed 1961)  There is one school; Pontefract De Lacy Primary School.  There was formerly a second pub called the Grove Lea but this is now a Tesco Express.

Public transport
The Arriva Yorkshire routes 410 and 411 connect the estate with Pontefract bus station, Xscape and Leeds.  The closest railway station is Pontefract Baghill with services to Sheffield and York.  The main railway stations in the town have services to Wakefield, Castleford and Leeds but these are situated further away.

People
 Author Patricia Duffy grew up on the estate and wrote the book Chequerfield about her upbringing on the estate.

Notes

External links

 Get Outside - Chequerfield

 
Geography of the City of Wakefield